42nd Street Ferry may refer to:

42nd Street Ferry (Weehawken), connecting West 42nd Street, Manhattan to the West Shore Railroad's Weehawken Terminal across the Hudson River in Weehawken, New Jersey
42nd Street Ferry (Williamsburg), connecting East 42nd Street, Manhattan with Broadway, Williamsburg across the East River